Anna Lynch may refer to:

 Anna Lynch (painter) (1865–1946), American painter
 Anna Lynch (billiards player), English billiards and snooker player from Australia
 Anna Theresa Berger Lynch (1853–1925), American musician